The hypothetical particles tachyons have inspired many occurrences of in fiction.  The use of the word in science fiction dates back at least to 1970 when James Blish's Star Trek novel Spock Must Die! incorporated tachyons into an ill-fated transporter experiment.

In general, tachyons are a standby mechanism upon which many science fiction authors rely to establish faster-than-light communication, with or without reference to causality issues. For example, in the Babylon 5 television series, tachyons are used for real-time communication over long distances.  Another instance is Gregory Benford's novel Timescape, winner of the Nebula Award, which involves the use of tachyons to transmit a message of salvation back in time.  Likewise, John Carpenter's horror film Prince of Darkness uses tachyons to explain how future humans send messages backward through time to warn the characters of their impending doom.  By contrast, Alan Moore's classic comic book limited series Watchmen features a character who uses "a squall of tachyons" broadcasting from space to muddle the mind of the only person on Earth capable of seeing the future.

The word "tachyon" has become widely recognized to such an extent that it can impart a science-fictional "sound" even if the subject in question has no particular relation to superluminal travel (compare positronic brain).  Classic Anime fans may associate tachyons with the energy source for the wave-motion gun and wave-motion engine in Space Battleship Yamato (Starblazers in the United States).  Further examples include the "Tachion Tanks" of the PC game Dark Reign and the "tachyon beam" of the game Master of Orion.  The space-combat sim Tachyon: The Fringe utilizes "tachyon gates" for superluminal travel but gives no exact explanation for the technology, and the MMORPG Eve Online features six types of "Large Tachyon Lasers", technically a contradiction since by definition, lasers emit light—photons, not any kind of hypothetical tachyon.

In popular culture

Comics
 The X-Men character Silver Samurai has the power to generate a tachyon field which can cut through everything but adamantium by channeling his mutant energy into anything, usually his katana.
 In the DC Universe, tachyons are used by both Hourman II and III.
 In Blue Beetle issue 7 and 8, tachyon weapons  are used by both Stopwatch and his assistant Short Timer.
 In the limited series Watchmen, Dr. Manhattan's ability to see into the future is blocked by tachyons generated by Adrian Veidt.
 In The Adventures of Superman Annual #3, the Wave-Rider is a character who claims that he was once human, but has been reduced to tachyons, and is thus able to travel backward and forward in time at will.  He follows a timeline to the future in order to determine whether or not Superman poses a threat to mankind.

Film
 In K-PAX (2001), in a conversation between Prot (played by Kevin Spacey) and Dr Powell (played by Jeff Bridges), Dr Powell explains "according to a man who lived on our planet named Einstein, nothing can travel faster than the speed of light". Prot replies "what Einstein actually said was that nothing can accelerate to the speed of light, because its mass would become infinite. Einstein said nothing about entities already traveling at the speed of light or faster, at tachyon speeds".
 In Land of the Lost (2009), Will Ferrell stars as Dr. Rick Marshall, who invented the "Tachyon Amplifier" that can supposedly boost a strong signal of Tachyon energy into a time warp that will lead to a universal lost and found, a virtual "Land of the Lost".
 In Prince of Darkness a video signal from the future travels on Tachyon particles to be received as a dream in a church in present-day Los Angeles.
 In Fantastic Four: Rise of the Silver Surfer, Reed Richards uses a Tachyon pulse generator, with four amplifiers placed in a four-point pattern, to disable the Silver Surfer and separate him from his board, rendering him powerless.
In Tomorrowland (2015), Tachyons are used to power The Monitor, a device which can see both the past and future. Tachyons also naturally produce temporary images of future events, much like a holographic video.
 In Max Steel (2016), the main protagonist Max can harvest the power of Tachyons to gain powers such as super strength and super speed.

Literature
 In Frank Herbert's Dune novels, there is a tachyon net allowing instant communication and particle manipulation through the Universe.
 In Evan Currie's Odyssey One, Captain Weston and his ship, the 'Odyssey' travel the known universe using a 'Transition' drive that uses tachyons to propel the ship and the crew omnidirectionally and instantly through space.
 In Isaac Asimov's novel Foundation's Edge, one of the main characters mentions that during a "Jump" through hyperspace, the matter—which includes the ship and everything inside it, including human passengers—are converted into tachyons for the instantaneous mode of interstellar travel in that novel's universe.
 In Dan Simmons's Hyperion universe, a faster-than-light communication medium, the "fatline", is used for starships and planets to send high-priority messages to each other without suffering months or years' delay for normal radio transmission. The fatline messages can be intercepted and decoded by fatline receivers, and the message is described in Hyperion as a "burst of decaying tachyons."
 Robert J. Sawyer's novel Flashforward features the invention of a Tachyon-Tardyon Collider, allowing experiments which previously required large particle accelerators to be performed in a machine about the size of a microwave. Additionally, a space probe is launched with a tachyon transmitter, allowing it to send information to Earth at faster-than-light speeds.
 In Terry Pratchett's Johnny Maxwell trilogy of children's books, the time-travelling bag-lady is called "Mrs. Tachyon."
 In the Wild Cards book series, the character Dr. Tachyon is so named because of the way in which his bioship flies faster than light, and because his own alien name is impractically long and difficult to pronounce.
 In Gregory Benford's novel Timescape, scientists at the end of the 20th century are attempting to communicate with the past to avoid a world-threatening event. This is achieved by sending tachyons to introduce noise into a physics experiment investigating spontaneous resonance and indium antimonide in the form of morse code pulses.
 In Margaret Peterson Haddix's The Missing (novel series) Trilogy, tachyons are depicted as particles that can travel through time. An airplane labeled Tachyon Travel was used to transport historical children through time.
In Alex Scarrow's TimeRiders series, they are used to send messages backwards in time.
In Frederik Pohl's novel The World at the End of Time, tachyons are one of the ways used by the plasma entities that live inside stars to communicate between themselves, the other being Einstein-Rosen-Podolsky pairs of particles.
In Nathan Van Coops' In Times Like These Trilogy, a tachyon pulse transmitter is mentioned to contact other time travelers in other parallel timelines.

Television
 In the Star Trek fictional universe, tachyons are among the fictitious or hypothetical particles frequently invoked in treknobabble, often as a deus ex machina used to maintain the plot. Tachyons are frequently invoked to explain some aspect of the Romulan cloaking device. In the film Star Trek: Insurrection, ships fire "tachyon pulses" at one another, disrupting the targets' "shield harmonics" and thereby allowing transport through the shields. Finally, in the third season Star Trek: Deep Space Nine episode "Explorers", a tachyon stream was used as an (accidental) means to propel an ancient solar sailing ship to warp speed. Tachyons are also often mentioned throughout each series when a plot contains references to time travel or time manipulation.  In "All Good Things...", the final episode of Star Trek: The Next Generation tachyons which were released cause a space-time fissure that threatens to destroy all life on Earth (along with the rest of the galaxy) in the distant past.
 The Tom Baker-era Doctor Who story "The Leisure Hive" features a race called the Argolins who utilise tachyons for a cloning-like procedure and for "illusions" as such. The Argolin Pangol explains, "Tachyons travel faster than light. A tachyon field can therefore be made to reach point B – that visidome, say – before its departure from point A, the Generator." Romana says that the Time Lords "abandoned tachyonics when we developed warp matrix engineering".
 Blake's 7 has the Season 4 episode "Orbit", where a scientist and his assistant have created the "Tachyon Funnel" — a powerful weapon that can destroy anything in the universe by harnessing the power of super-dense stellar matter.  Events can be watched in real-time from the Funnel, and the demonstration destroys a moon several light-years away.
 In the series pilot of Eureka, scientist Walter Perkins creates a "tachyon accelerator", activates it, and as a result the laws of physics and the fabric of space-time itself begin to unravel. This is apparently due to a "tachyon collision" created by the machine. The effects are stopped by creating a second collision to counteract the first.
 In the NBC series Journeyman, tachyons have been mentioned as a theory, possibly explaining the mysterious trips through time experienced by Dan Vasser.
In the 2009–2010 season series FlashForward, Lloyd Simcoe's ability to discover the month of a second global blackout depends on his ability to decipher the tachyon constant.
In the 2006-2007 tokusatsu series Kamen Rider Kabuto, Kamen Riders use tachyon powered rider belts known as Zecters to combat the Worms, who have an ability to move faster-than-light. The main protagonist, Souji Tendou can use an upgrade called the Hyper Zecter to perform faster than light travel, enabling him to travel back in time.
 In Space Battleship Yamato, the wave motion engine uses tachyons to enable faster-than-light travel. This technology was given to the humans by Iscander which already had FTL capable engines. The enemy, the Gamilus also had tachyons using engines and so both could fight at the same speed and achieve faster than light travel. The Yamato also utilizes tachyons in its signature weapon, the wave motion gun.
 In Justice League, during the episode "Hereafter", Vandal Savage explains that the disintegrator beam Toyman's machine hit Superman with was actually an energized tachyon stream. This was responsible for sending Superman thousands of years into the future.
 In the 2013 series Max Steel, Max McGrath is able to generate Tachyon Unlimited Radiant Bio-Optimized (T.U.R.B.O) Energy from his body, due to the fact that he's half Tachyon. An Alien-friend, Steel is introduced as an Ultra-Link that bonds with him, helping him to regulate his T.U.R.B.O Energy to its full-potential. In episode Legend of Ja'em Mk'Rah, Max's father, Jim McGrath was revealed to be an alien being from the Planet Tachyon.
 In the episode "Synchrony" of the FOX series The X-Files, tachyons are suggested to be the particles through which time travel is possible. As explained by a man in the episode who is revealed to have returned from the future to kill the scientists whose work makes time travel possible, the discovery of tachyons inspire scientist Lisa Ianelli to synthesize a chemical compound that acts as a catalyst for triggering a self-sustaining endothermic reaction that reduces the temperature of a body to well-below freezing. The state caused by the reaction enables time travel by countering the negative effects of moving beyond the speed of light.
 In the Episode "Dreamland" of the FOX series The X-Files, they speak also about tachyons when the Lone Gunman analyze the Black Box of the crashed Test Plane
 In Babylon 5, humans confirmed the existence of the Tachyon particle in 2091. By the time of the shows setting in 2258 Humans used Tachyon communications for real time faster than light communications over distances of up to 2,000 light years.
 In the 2014 live action series The Flash, the team search for signs of time travel by looking for residual tachyons. In the presence of tachyons, gravity is altered allowing liquids to rise out of their containers. Eobard Thawne (aka The Reverse Flash) also implanted one such device into his wheelchair to enhance his speed to defeat Barry Allen yet it was also repurposed to help Firestorm maintain stability. In season 2 a similar device is used by Barry to defeat Zoom after travelling back in time to obtain its schematics from The Reverse Flash.
 Tachyon particles are also mentioned several times in the Disney TV series Best Friends Whenever and appear when time travelers Cyd and Shelby 'jump' backwards or forwards in time.
 In Dark Matter 2017 the android mentions sending tachyons into a rift as a beacon to locate the rest of the crew.
 In the Red Dwarf episode Holoship the holograms of the Enlightenment are, like their ship, seemingly composed of Tachyons. Also super Tachyon-powered drives are mentioned at various points in the Red Dwarf television series such as in the aforementioned episode Holoship and also the episode Ouroboros.
In Godzilla: The series, Tachyons are a prominent part of episodes revolving around alien invasions.

Video games
 In the MMORPG Maplestory, a quest has the player collect tachyons in order to rebuild a barrier between dimensions which Papulatus, a time- and space-distorting monster has destroyed.
 In Paradox Interactive's Stellaris, an empire can research Tachyon Sensors, to increase the survey speed for planets and the fleet's overall sensor range, as well as deadly long-range Tachyon Lance weaponry. 
 In the PC Game Tachyon: The Fringe, humanity has learned to harness the particle to create gates that allow faster-than-light travel within and between solar systems.
 In Ratchet & Clank Future: Tools of Destruction, the main antagonist is Emperor Percival Tachyon.
 In the PC Pinball Timeshock!, the game's main story focuses on finding pieces of Tachyonium through time.
 In Sid Meier's Alpha Centauri, certain technological advances allow the construction of a Tachyon Field (perimeter defense) and a Tachyon bolt (weapon).
 A technician's maintenance report offhandedly mentions tachyons as being a part of stasis technology in Dead Space 2.
In Transformers: Fall of Cybertron, cars are equipped with a tachyon repeater as the weapon for vehicle form.
 In Master of Orion 2 the Physics technology tree allow for the uses of tachyon communications, used for communication several parsecs away.
 In The Wonderful 101 the hero's ship, The Virgin Victory, is able to detect encroaching alien enemies with a Tachyon Radar.
 In EVE Online, there is a long-range battleship-sized weapon called the 'Tachyon Beam Laser'.
 In Starsector, Tri-Tachyon Corporation is the pioneer of unregulated AI technology abs the main user of phase and high-technology ships and weaponry.
 In the PC Game Wing Commander: Privateer, the Tachyon Cannon is the most powerful of the Terran weapons.
In the game Marvel's Avengers, AIM uses Tachyon particles to build a Time Bridge capable of transporting a person or object to a different point time.

Music
 The experimental hip hop group Death Grips has a song called Takyon (Death Yon) on their mixtape Exmilitary.
 The Swedish rock band Second Sun released a song called Tachyonregenerator on a 7" vinyl single of the same name in 2016.
 The British music group Tripswitch named a track Tachyon for the referencing the recorded background dialog from a movie about a space traveler to Earth.
 The German synthwave producer Compilerbau released an album called Tachyon in 2014.

Other
 Tachyon is a character in the lonelygirl15 related OpAphid alternate reality game.  She is a spy working for a secret organisation in opposition to OpAphid's activities.
 In the Yu-Gi-Oh! trading card game and Yu-Gi-Oh! Zexal series, there is a powerful boss monster called "No. 107 Galaxy-Eyes Tachyon Dragon", which stands in opposition to a rival monster, "Galaxy-Eyes Photon Dragon".
 The Tachyon, Tachyon 2 and Tachyon 3 are names of models of balisongs (butterfly knife) produced by Microtech Knives and originally designed by Mike Turber.
 In the board game T.I.M.E. Stories, players work for the T.I.M.E. (Tachyonic Insertion in Major Events) agency, which uses Tachyons to send agents back in time to prevent the formations of various temporal faults.

Manga
 In One Piece, Niji has the ability to infuse electricity into his katana for increased speed. Which he moves in a lightning bolt shape-like motion to strike down his opponents one after another. Which he calls it, Tachyon-Blade Henry Blazer in the manga.

See also
A chronon is a fictional elementary particle with time-travel properties in some works of science fiction.
Thiotimoline

References

External links

Physics in fiction
Fiction